Isaac Barb (26 June 1827 – 21 February 1903) was a Galician Jewish educator, translator, and poet. He published the first Hebrew translation of Shakespeare's Macbeth in 1883, adapted from Schiller's German translation.

Bibliography

References

1827 births
1903 deaths
Jewish translators
Hebrew-language poets
Jews from Galicia (Eastern Europe)
People of the Haskalah
People from Jarosław
Translators of William Shakespeare
Translators to Hebrew